The Nissan P engine is a large overhead valve, inline-six cylinder engine manufactured by Nissan Diesel Motor Co., Ltd. from 1959 to 2003 and used in light-duty trucks by Nissan, as well as in the Nissan Patrol. It replaced Nissan's older, sidevalve engines with which it shared its dimensions. This series of engines were based on the pre-war Type A engine, which was a license built Graham-Paige design.

NAK
Introduced in 1950, this is a  petrol inline six-cylinder engine which produces . This was directly derived from Nissan's pre-war A engine, a license-built Graham-Paige unit.

Applications:
 Nissan 290 Bus
 1950 Nissan Patrol 4W70
 1951 Nissan Patrol 4W60
 1952-1953 Nissan 380
 1952-1953 Nissan 390 Bus

NB
Introduced in 1953, this is a  petrol inline six-cylinder engine which produces .

Applications:
 1953-1954 Nissan 480
 1953-1954 Nissan 490 Bus
 1955 Nissan Patrol 4W61

NC
It was used in various buses and trucks as well as in early Nissan Patrols.

Applications:
 1955-1959 Nissan 482 Truck
 1955 Nissan 492 Bus
 1955-1957 Nissan 580 Truck
 1958-1959 Nissan 582 Truck
 1955-1957 Nissan 590 Bus
 1958-1959 Nissan 592 Bus
 1955-1959 Nissan Carrier 4W72
 1956-1959 Nissan Cabstar E590
 1956-1959 Nissan Patrol 4W65

P
Later variants were called P40, reflecting the engine displacement in liters (4.0). A variant especially for fire-fighting duties, with a stronger alternator, an engine block heater, and various other improvements, was called the PF engine.

Applications:
 Nissan Cabstar E690
 1959-1960 Nissan Patrol 4W66
 1959-1968 Nissan Carrier 4W73
 1959-1968 Nissan 680 Truck
 1960-1968 Nissan 690 Bus
 1960-1980 Nissan Patrol 60 series
 1963-1968 Nissan FR40 fire engine
 1968-1969 Nissan 681 Truck
 1968-1969 Nissan 691 Bus
 1970-? Nissan G780
 1980-1989 Nissan Patrol 160 series
 1986-2003 Nissan Patrol 260 series

References

P
Straight-six engines